Anastasiya Prenko (born 12 March 1993) is a former professional tennis player from Turkmenistan. She is the former Turkmenistan No. 1.

Prenko has won one doubles title on the ITF Circuit. On 3 May 2010, she achieved her career-high singles ranking of world No. 536. On 24 October 2011, she peaked at No. 529 in the doubles rankings.

Prwnko won bronze medal at the 2017 Islamic Solidarity Games at the women's team event.

Playing for Turkmenistan in Fed Cup, Prenko has a win–loss record of 24–15.

ITF finals

Doubles: 4 (1 title, 3 runner-ups)

References

External links
 
 
 

1993 births
Living people
Sportspeople from Ashgabat
Turkmenistan female tennis players
Tennis players at the 2010 Asian Games
Tennis players at the 2014 Asian Games
Asian Games competitors for Turkmenistan
21st-century Turkmenistan women